Zieria involucrata is a plant in the citrus family Rutaceae and is endemic to New South Wales. It is a sparse, erect shrub with mostly three-part leaves and groups of up to 21 small white flowers, the groups shorter than the leaves. It mostly occurs in the lower Blue Mountains, but is also known from other areas around Sydney.

Description
The leaflets are more or less flat, dark green on the upper surface and light greyish-green below. The flowers are white, sometimes with a pink tinge and arranged in groups of between three and 21, the groups mostly shorter than the leaves. There are four stamens. Flowering occurs from August to October and is followed by fruits that are hairy follicles.

Taxonomy and naming
Zieria involucrata was first formally described in 1863 by George Bentham from an unpublished description by Robert Brown. Bentham's description was published in Flora Australiensis. The specific epithet (involucrata) is derived from the Latin word involucrum meaning "wrapper", "case" or "envelope", referring to the persistent bracts.

Distribution and habitat
This zieria grows in wet forest, mainly in the lower Blue Mountains but has also been recorded from north and west of Sydney.

Conservation
Zieria involucrata is classified as "vulnerable" under the Australian Government Environment Protection and Biodiversity Conservation Act 1999 and as "endangered" under the New South Wales Government Threatened Species Conservation Act 1995. The main threat to the species is inappropriate fire regimes, especially frequent fires.

References

involucrata
Sapindales of Australia
Flora of New South Wales
Plants described in 1863